Flyright Records is a British record label incorporated in 1970 by Mike Leadbitter, Simon Napier, and Bruce Bastin. It specializes in blues by British musicians, though it issued some American jazz discs, including Ralph Sutton and Hoagy Carmichael.

See also 
 List of record labels

References

External links
 Flyright Records at Interstate Music Ltd.
 Illustrated Flyright Records discography

British record labels
Record labels established in 1970
Blues record labels
Jazz record labels
Reissue record labels